James Key (born 14 January 1972) is a British engineer who works in Formula One as executive technical director for McLaren.

Education
James Key studied Mechanical Engineering at the University of Nottingham. Lotus Engineering sponsored him to his degree in 1996.

Formula One career
Key joined Jordan Grand Prix in 1998 spending several years as a data engineer, then became race engineer for Takuma Sato. Following a year in the Wind Tunnel he transferred to the Vehicle Dynamics department, eventually becoming the department head during the team's final few seasons as Jordan Grand Prix.

Shortly after the team's ownership transferred to MF1 Racing, he became Technical Director during the 2005 Formula One season following a brief period as Technical Co-ordinator. He was one of the youngest Technical Directors of a Formula One team, at the age of 33 years, along with Sam Michael (born in 1971) who became the technical director of the Williams F1 team at the age of 33 during the 2004 season. Key retained his position during the team's transition through Spyker F1 to Force India F1. 

In April 2010 he left Force India to join the Sauber team, replacing Willy Rampf as Technical Director. He remained there for almost two years, before leaving in February 2012 to accept an undisclosed offer with one of the British-based teams.

On 6 September 2012, it was announced that Key had joined Scuderia Toro Rosso as Technical Director, replacing Giorgio Ascanelli.

On 26 July 2018, McLaren confirmed that Key had agreed to become technical director of the team, replacing the ousted Tim Goss. On 22 February 2019 it was announced that Key would join McLaren from 25 March 2019, just after the Australian Grand Prix. He forms a triumvirate with Andrea Stella as Racing Director and Piers Thynne as Production Director, all under Team Principal Andreas Seidl.

References

Formula One designers
Spyker
1972 births
Living people
Place of birth missing (living people)
British motorsport designers
Scuderia Toro Rosso
McLaren people
Force India
Sauber Motorsport